Chebrolu mandal is one of the 57 mandals in Guntur district of the Indian state of Andhra Pradesh. It is under the administration of Tenali revenue division and the headquarters are located at Chebrolu. The mandal is bounded by Guntur, Pedakakani, Tenali, Vatticherukuru, Tsundur and Ponnur mandals.

Administration 

The mandal is also a part of the Andhra Pradesh Capital Region under the jurisdiction of APCRDA. The mandal is under the control of a tahsildar and the present tahsildar is S.Jagan Mohan Rao. Chebrolu mandal is one of the 3 mandals under Ponnur (Assembly constituency), which in turn represents Guntur (Lok Sabha constituency) of Andhra Pradesh.

Towns and villages 

 census, the mandal has 19 settlements. It includes 1 town and 11 villages.

The settlements in the mandal are listed below:

 Chebrolu
 Godavarru
 Manchala
 Meesaragadda Ananthavaram
 Narakodur
 Pathareddipalem
 Sekuru
 Srirangapuram
 Suddapalle
 Vadlamudi
 Vejendla
kotthareddipalem

See also 
 List of mandals in Andhra Pradesh
 Villages in Chebrolu mandal

References

Mandals in Guntur district